Nmixx (stylized in all caps; formerly known as JYPn) is a South Korean girl group formed by SQU4D, a sub-label of JYP Entertainment. The group is composed of six  members: Lily, Haewon, Sullyoon, Bae, Jiwoo, and Kyujin. The group debuted on February 22, 2022, with their single album Ad Mare. Originally a septet, Jinni departed from the group on December 9, 2022.

Name
The name Nmixx combines the letter "N", which stands for "now", "new", "next", and the unknown "n", and the word "mix", which symbolizes combination and diversity, altogether meaning "the best combination for a new era".

Career

2021–present: Introduction, debut with Ad Mare, Entwurf, and Jinni's departure

On July 9, 2021, JYP Entertainment announced a new girl group would be debuting in February 2022, its first since Itzy in 2019. From July 16 to July 25, JYP Entertainment made pre-orders available for a limited edition of the group's debut package, titled Blind Package, which included the group's debut album and album-related materials. The members were revealed through various dance videos and song covers from August 6 to November 19 (in order: Jinni, Jiwoo, Kyujin, Sullyoon, Bae, Haewon, and Lily).

On January 26, 2022, JYP Entertainment announced the group's name to be Nmixx, until then tentatively called JYPn. On February 2, it was announced that they would debut on February 22 with the release of Ad Mare. On February 18, 2022, JYP Entertainment announced that the group's debut showcase, originally scheduled for February 22, would be postponed to March 1 after group member  Bae tested positive for COVID-19.

Nmixx collaborated with the DreamWorks Animation's Gabby's Dollhouse to release the Korean version of "Hey Gabby!", alongside the B-side "Sparkling Party", on May 2. They also participated in Project Ribbon's Summer Vacation Project, along with Fromis 9 and Oh My Girl Banhana, to cover Rainbow's "Kiss", from their 2009 debut EP Gossip Girl. The song was released on July 31.

On September 19, Nmixx released their second single album Entwurf, alongside the lead single "Dice". The group released their first "Intermixxion" single and first Christmas song, titled "Funky Glitter Christmas" on November 23.

On December 9, 2022, JYP Entertainment announced that Jinni had departed from the group and terminated her contract due to personal circumstances, and Nmixx will continue as a six-member group.

On February 9, 2023, JYP Entertainment announced Nmixx will be releasing their first extended play titled Expérgo on March 20.

On March 16, 2023, JYP Entertainment announced Nmixx will  have a tour in North America in May as part of their world tour "Nice to MIXX You".

Members

Current
 Lily – vocalist
 Haewon – leader, vocalist
 Sullyoon – vocalist, dancer
 Bae – vocalist, dancer
 Jiwoo – rapper, vocalist, dancer
 Kyujin – rapper, vocalist, dancer

Former
 Jinni – vocalist, dancer, rapper

Timeline

Discography

Extended plays

Single albums

Singles

Promotional singles

Soundtrack appearances

Other charted songs

Videography

Music videos

Awards and nominations

Notes

References

External links
 

2022 establishments in South Korea
K-pop music groups
Musical groups established in 2022
Musical groups from Seoul
South Korean girl groups
JYP Entertainment artists
South Korean dance music groups